Li Zhenzhu (born 13 December 1985 in Bayannur, Inner Mongolia) is a female Chinese long-distance runner who specializes in the 3000 metres steeplechase.

She competed at the 2007 World Championships without reaching the final. She represented her country at the 2008 Summer Olympics and 2012 Summer Olympics.

At the 2014 Asian Games, she won the silver medal behind Ruth Jebet.

Her personal best times are:
1500 metres - 4:14.57 min (2004)
3000 metres - 9:17.52 min (2004)
3000 metres steeplechase - 9:32.35 min (2007), Asian record at the time.

References

Team China 2008
 

1985 births
Living people
Chinese female long-distance runners
Athletes (track and field) at the 2008 Summer Olympics
Athletes (track and field) at the 2012 Summer Olympics
Athletes (track and field) at the 2016 Summer Olympics
Olympic athletes of China
People from Bayannur
Runners from Inner Mongolia
Athletes (track and field) at the 2014 Asian Games
Asian Games medalists in athletics (track and field)
Asian Games silver medalists for China
Chinese female steeplechase runners
Medalists at the 2014 Asian Games
Universiade medalists in athletics (track and field)
Universiade silver medalists for China
Medalists at the 2011 Summer Universiade